Willem Joost "Wim" Deetman (born 3 April 1945) is a retired Dutch politician and teacher who served as Minister of Education and Sciences from 1982 to 1989, Speaker of the House of Representatives from 1989 to 1996 and Mayor of The Hague from 1996 until 2008. He was a member of the Christian Historical Union (CHU) until it was merged into the Christian Democratic Appeal (CDA) in 1980, which he joined.

Education and early career 
Deetman attended a Gymnasium in Gouda from June 1957 until June 1963, and applied at the Free University Amsterdam in July 1966 majoring in Political science and obtained a Bachelor of Social Science degree in June 1968 before graduating with a Master of Social Science degree in July 1972. Deetman worked as a researcher for the Protestant Christian Education association (VBPCO) from August 1972 until May 1974. Deetman served on the Municipal Council of Gouda from April 1974 until September 1981. Deetman worked as a civics teacher and principal at a middle school in Gouda from May 1974 until January 1978.

Election to the House of Representatives 
Deetman became a Member of the House of Representatives after Durk van der Mei was appointed as State Secretary for Foreign Affairs in the Cabinet Van Agt–Wiegel after the election of 1977, taking office on 16 January 1978. After the election of 1981 Deetman was appointed as State Secretary for Education and Sciences in the Cabinet Van Agt II, taking office on 11 September 1981. The Cabinet Van Agt II fell just seven months into its term on 12 May 1982 and continued to serve in a demissionary capacity until the first cabinet formation of 1982 when it was replaced by the caretaker Cabinet Van Agt III with Deetman appointed as Minister of Education and Sciences, taking office on 29 May 1982. After the election of 1982 Deetman returned as a Member of the House of Representatives, taking office on 16 September 1982. Following the second cabinet formation of 1982 Deetman continued as Minister of Education and Sciences in the Cabinet Lubbers I, taking office on 4 November 1982. After the election of 1986 Deetman again returned as a Member of the House of Representatives, taking office on 3 June 1986. Following the second cabinet formation of 1986 Deetman remained as Minister of Education and Sciences in the Cabinet Lubbers II, taking office on 14 July 1986. The Cabinet Lubbers II fell on 3 May 1989 and continued to serve in a demissionary capacity. After the election of 1989 Deetman once again returned as a Member of the House of Representatives and was elected as Speaker of the House of Representatives, he resigned as Minister of Education and Sciences the same day he was installed as a Member of the House of Representatives and Speaker of the House of Representatives, taking office on 14 September 1989. After the election of 1994 Deetman was re-elected as Speaker of the House of Representatives, taking office on 17 May 1994. In November 1996 Deetman was nominated as Mayor of The Hague, he resigned as a Member of the House of Representatives and Speaker of the House of Representatives the same day he was installed as Mayor, taking office on 1 December 1996. In July 2007 Deetman announced he was stepping down as Mayor. In December 2009 Deetman was nominated as a Member of the Council of State, he resigned as Mayor the same day he was installed as a Member of the Council of State, serving from 1 January 2008 until 1 May 2015.

Deetman retired after spending 37 years in national politics and became active in the private sector and public sector and occupied numerous seats as a corporate director and nonprofit director on several boards of directors and supervisory boards (ADO Den Haag, Mauritshuis, Parliamentary Documentation Center, Kloosterkerk, Madurodam, Cornelia Foundation and the Institute for Multiparty Democracy) and served on several  and councils on behalf of the government (Catholic Church sexual abuse Commission and Public Pension Funds APB).

Decorations

References

External links

Official
  Drs. W.J. (Wim) Deetman Parlement & Politiek

 

 

1945 births
Living people
Christian Democratic Appeal politicians
Christian Historical Union politicians
Commanders of the Order of Orange-Nassau
Commanders of the Order of the Netherlands Lion
Dutch members of the Dutch Reformed Church
Dutch nonprofit directors
Dutch nonprofit executives
Dutch school administrators
Dutch sports executives and administrators
Grand Officiers of the Légion d'honneur
Mayors of The Hague
Members of the Council of State (Netherlands)
Members of the House of Representatives (Netherlands)
Ministers of Education of the Netherlands
Municipal councillors in South Holland
People from Gouda, South Holland
Protestant Church Christians from the Netherlands
Recipients of the Grand Cross of the Order of Leopold II
Speakers of the House of Representatives (Netherlands)
State Secretaries for Education of the Netherlands
Vrije Universiteit Amsterdam alumni
20th-century Dutch educators
20th-century Dutch politicians
21st-century Dutch civil servants
21st-century Dutch politicians